Aranea may refer to:

 A genus of orb-weaver spiders, synonym of Araneus
 Aranea Serket, a character from the webcomic Homestuck
 A character in E. B. White's children's novel Charlotte's Web and its film adaptations, a baby spider who is Charlotte's daughter
 Aranea Highwind, a character in the game Final Fantasy XV
 Aranea (Dungeons & Dragons), fictional creatures from the Dungeons & Dragons game

See also
Aranae, an order of flowering plants
Araneae, the order of spiders

nl:Spin